Italy competed at the 2006 European Athletics Championships in Gothenburg, Sweden, from 7 to 13 August 2006.

Medalists

See also
 Italy national athletics team

References

External links
 EAA official site 

 

Italy at the European Athletics Championships
Nations at the 2006 European Athletics Championships
2006 in Italian sport